"Gunga Din" is an 1890 poem by Rudyard Kipling set in British India.
The poem is much remembered for its final line: "You're a better man than I am, Gunga Din".

Background

The poem is a rhyming narrative from the point of view of a British soldier in India. Its eponymous character is an Indian water-carrier (a bhishti) who, after the narrator is wounded in battle, saves his life, only to be shot and killed. In the final three lines, the soldier regrets the abuse that he dealt to Din and admits that Din is the better man. The poem was published as part of a set of martial poems called the Barrack-Room Ballads.

In contrast to Kipling's later poem "The White Man's Burden", "Gunga Din" is named after the Indian and portrays him as a heroic character who is not afraid to face danger on the battlefield as he tends to wounded men. The white soldiers who order Din around and beat him for not bringing water to them fast enough are presented as being callous and shallow and ultimately inferior to him.

Although "Din" is frequently pronounced to rhyme with "pin", the rhymes within the poem make it clear that it should be pronounced , to rhyme with "green".

T. S. Eliot included the poem in his 1941 collection A Choice of Kipling's Verse.

Adaptations and references in popular culture

The poem inspired the 1939 adventure film Gunga Din from RKO Pictures, starring Sam Jaffe in the title role, along with Cary Grant, Victor McLaglen, Douglas Fairbanks Jr., and Joan Fontaine. This movie was remade in 1961 as Sergeants 3, starring the Rat Pack with Sammy Davis Jr. as the Gunga Din character, in which the locale was moved from British-colonial India to the old West. Many elements of the 1939 film were also incorporated into Indiana Jones and the Temple of Doom. The film Three Kings, set during the Gulf War of 1990–1991, also has many resemblances, including a "heist theme", to the film Gunga Din.

Grantland Rice's 1917 column describing Heinie Zimmerman's infamous World Series gaffe wherein Zimmerman futilely chased speedster Eddie Collins across home plate (rather than initiating a rundown by tossing the ball to a player covering home) ended with "I'm a faster man than you are, Heinie Zim."

Robert Sheckley's short story "Human Man's Burden" (1956, anthologized in Pilgrimage to Earth) alludes to the story by featuring a robotic servant named Gunga Sam, programmed to behave in a manner similar to the stereotypical colonial native servant. While stated to have no soul, he ultimately proves to be no less human and wise than his owner in actions.

In 1958, Bobby Darin wrote and recorded the song "That's the Way Love Is" in which, referring to the unsolved riddle of love, he sings "And if ya come up with the answer, You're a better man, sir, than I ... Gunga Din".

In 1962, Sonny Gianotta recorded "The Last Blast of the Blasted Bugler", a comedic retelling of the story.

An animated version featuring Jim Backus was made in 1964, as part of The Famous Adventures of Mr Magoo. It is the third episode of the series.

The English singer Peter Bellamy included a setting of the poem on his 1975 record, Barrack Room Ballads of Rudyard Kipling.

The American trio The Three D's included a folk music rendition of the poem on their Capitol Records album New Dimensions in Folk Songs in 1964.  

Songwriter Jim Croce set the words to music and released it on his 1966 Facets album.

In the 1994 version of Spider-Man, the Punisher refers to Kraven the Hunter as Gunga Din.

Hawkeye Pierce (portrayed by Alan Alda) in M*A*S*H made multiple references to "Gunga Din".

Alan Moore's Watchmen features a restaurant called the Gunga Diner.

In 1996, the animated television series Animaniacs featured a segment called "Gunga Dot", in which the "Warner Sister" Dot has a job serving water to the patrons of a resort in a boiling hot desert near Bombay. After growing tired of the constant complaining, she releases the valve on the Warner Bros. Water Tower, which placates the guests and somehow creates the Indian Ocean.

Season 1, episode 6, of The Sopranos, Livia is complaining to Tony about her neighbour at Green Grove running the water all day long, and she says "I'm living next to Gunga Din!" In the season 6, episode 14, of The Sopranos ("Stage 5"), Warren Feldman asks John Sacrimoni whether he may look at Sacrimoni's health chart. Sacrimoni replies, "What about Gunga Din?" in reference to his prison doctor, Ajit Gupte.

In 2001, Hellboy, in Conqueror Worm, says goodbye to Roger with the last lines of Gunga Din.

Several references are made to the poem in the series Downton Abbey by several characters, among them Lord Grantham (portrayed by Hugh Bonneville). In some of the references to the poem's last line, “better” is purposefully switched to “braver” to reflect the context of the scene.

In the 2011 video game L.A. Noire, Cole Phelps' partner as a patrol officer remarks "In for a penny, in for a pound. Lead away, Gunga Din" as they leave the gun store during the Scooter Peyton tutorial case.

The poem's last line is quoted to Richard Haig, the main character in the 2014 film Some Kind of Beautiful, by his father Gordon on his deathbed, both characters being English literature professors.

In 2015, The Libertines, an English rock band, composed the single "Gunga Din" for their comeback album Anthems for Doomed Youth. The verse "You are a better man than I am" is used throughout the lyrics.

Bob Dylan's song "You Ain't Goin' Nowhere" has been recorded with a variety of lyrics, and in one version the first two lines are "Crowd so swift, the rain fallin' in. Gonna see a movie called Gunga Din." It is likely that this was a rhyming artifice. Dylan's original lyrics contained the phrase "Pick up your money, pack up your tent", but when the Byrds, led by Roger McGuinn and who frequently covered Dylan's songs, recorded it, the line was transposed to "Pack up your money, pick up your tent". In a revised version, Dylan rewrote the third line to read "Pack up your money pull up your tent McGuinn", so he likely needed something to rhyme with "McGuinn."

See also
No Heaven for Gunga Din, with a similar theme about the treatment of native servants by colonial military officers.

References

Sources
 George Robinson: "Gunga Din" (article on the 1939 Hollywood film).  Soldiers of the Queen (journal of the Victorian Military Society).  September 1994.

External links
 
 Text of the poem at The Poetry Foundation

Poetry by Rudyard Kipling
Rudyard Kipling poems about India
1890 poems
Jim Croce songs
Characters in poems